Vestbygda or Offersøy is a village in Lødingen Municipality in Nordland county, Norway. The village is located on the southern shore of the island of Hinnøya along the inner part of the Vestfjorden. The central village area of Vestbygda is called Offersøy, and that is where Vestbygd Church is located.

References

External links
 

Lødingen
Villages in Nordland